Buxières-sous-Montaigut (literally Buxières under Montaigut) is a commune in the Puy-de-Dôme department in Auvergne-Rhône-Alpes in central France.

Population

See also
 Communes of the Puy-de-Dôme department

References

Communes of Puy-de-Dôme